Straškov-Vodochody is a municipality in Litoměřice District in the Ústí nad Labem Region of the Czech Republic. It has about 1,100 inhabitants.

Administrative parts
The municipality is made up of villages of Straškov and Vodochody. They are urbanistically fused.

Geography
It lies in a flat agricultural landscape of the Lower Eger Table.

History
The first written mention of Vodochody is from 999, when Duke Boleslaus II donated Vodochody to the Ostrov Monastery. The first written mention of Straškov is from 1271. The municipality was established on 1 January 1950 by merger of municipalities of Straškov and Vodochody.

Sights
The landmark of the municipality is the Church of Saint Wenceslaus in Straškov. The complex of the original romanesque church from the 12th century was rebuilt in the Gothic style in the 14th century, but several romanesque elements have been preserved to this day. In the 18th century, baroque modifications were made.

Notable people
Václav Renč (1911–1973), poet and translator

References

External links

Villages in Litoměřice District